Robert Williams House is a historic home located near Eastover, Cumberland County, North Carolina. It was built about 1850, and is a -story Greek Revival style Coastal Cottage form dwelling.  It has a gable roof with exterior end chimneys and features an engaged porch.   Also on the property are the contributing smokehouse, original log corn crib, and a stable with loft.

It was listed on the National Register of Historic Places in 1983.

References

Houses on the National Register of Historic Places in North Carolina
Greek Revival houses in North Carolina
Houses completed in 1850
Houses in Cumberland County, North Carolina
National Register of Historic Places in Cumberland County, North Carolina